"Beach" is a song written and recorded by Australian indie pop band San Cisco, listed from the band's debut self-titled studio album. The song was released in the United Kingdom, as the band's debut single on 10 December 2012 where the song was released as a 2x7" single.

Reception

Alice Juster from MusicFeeds said the song "is romantically haunting, featuring vocals from both Jordi Davieson and Scarlett Stevens, who launches into a bright and dreamy chorus."

Dan Stubbs from NME called the song "blissful and filmic, with [a] throbbing emoti-bass and spooky-kid vocals in the chorus."

Rebecca Clough from The Digital Fix called it "the catchiest chorus you'll have heard for a while".

Paul Lester from The Guardian said, "'[Beach]' opens with a keyboard chord that is pure 'Africa' by Toto, suggestive of chill-wave opulence, but when the song gets going it becomes an indie singalong, albeit one with a kick."

Music video
The music video premiered on 31 October 2012. It was filmed on Brighton Beach and was directed by Ruskin Kyle.

Track listings
UK 2x 7" single
 "Beach"	
 "Golden Revolver"	
 "Reckless"	
 "Lover"

Digital single
 "Beach" - 3:40

Release history

References

2012 singles
2012 songs
San Cisco songs
Songs written by Scarlett Stevens